Thenkurissi-I is a village in Palakkad district in the state of Kerala, India.

Demographics
 India census, Thenkurissi-I had a population of 13,883 with 6,768 males and 7,115 females.

References

External links
 Local Community Site

Villages in Palakkad district